Sheila Diana Ferguson (born October 8, 1947) is an American singer, songwriter, actress, and author, who has worked primarily in the United Kingdom. She was the second longest-serving member of the 1970s American female soul music group The Three Degrees, singing lead vocals on most of the group's biggest hits, most notably "When Will I See You Again", which had international success topping the UK Singles Chart and peaking at #2 in the US.

Following her departure from The Three Degrees in 1986, Ferguson went on to have her own solo singing career, touring internationally, making multiple TV appearances, and releasing a solo album titled A New Kind of Medicine. She has forged a prolific stage and screen career in the UK, starring in numerous musicals, soul legend tours, and her own sitcom Land of Hope and Gloria. She is also the best-selling author of Soul Food: Classic Cuisine from the Deep South.

Early life
Sheila Diana Ferguson was born in  Philadelphia, Pennsylvania. Despite attending more than 10 schools as a child, she was academically gifted and had originally wanted to become a psychologist. A teenage crush on the singer Marvin Gaye led her to try her hand at singing in the hope that, by doing so, she would be able to meet him. She achieved this dream some time later when, appearing at the Apollo Theater, she talked to Gaye in his dressing room.

While at high school, Ferguson was introduced by her teacher to Richard Barrett, who had previously been a singer with a group called The Valentines, and later had gone on to become a manager. Barrett placed Ferguson's first single, "Little Red Riding Hood/How Did That Happen" with Landa Records,#706.  Subsequently signed to Swan Records, Ferguson also recorded the first two songs she wrote herself "I Weep for You" and "Don't Leave Me Lover" out of three solo singles for the label during 1965.

Other solo songs she recorded were "How Did That Happen", written by Ugene Dozier , "And in Return" and "Are You Satisfied", written by General Johnson (later to become known to the world as the lead singer of Chairmen of the Board).

Ferguson recorded two up-tempo numbers written for her by a talented up and coming songwriter by the name of Leon Huff. Huff would later team up with the gifted and prolific Kenny Gamble to form the legendary Philadelphia International Records. These were "Heartbroken Memories" and "Signs of Love".

Career

Soul music

The Three Degrees
Although Barrett signed Ferguson as a solo artist, he was already in the process of creating a group called The Three Degrees with the line up of Fayette Pinkney, Shirley Porter and Linda Turner. By 1966, the line up had changed to be Fayette Pinkney, Helen Scott and Janet Harmon. However, Scott announced she would be leaving the group in order to get married. Having previously appeared with the group as a cover when one of the girls fell ill, Ferguson was asked by Pinkney and Harmon to become a permanent member. In 1967, Harmon left the group and was replaced by Valerie Holiday. Barrett signed them to several record labels, and by 1970, they were signed to Roulette Records and released their first album Maybe, the title song of which reached #4 in the US R&B charts. The singles "I Do Take You" and "You're the Fool" followed as well as second album So Much Love.

In 1971, the group appeared in the Oscar-winning film The French Connection singing "Everybody Gets to Go to the Moon", and in 1973, they appeared in the sitcom Sanford and Son.

It was during this year that The Three Degrees enjoyed their greatest success when signed by Philadelphia International Records and working with Gamble and Huff. Their first song under this label was "TSOP (The Sound of Philadelphia)", which was the theme song for Soul Train. Under this label the group began to tour internationally. The self-titled The Three Degrees was released in 1973 and yielded hits such as "Dirty Ol' Man" (which went to #13 in the UK Singles Chart) and "Year of Decision" (which went to gold in the Netherlands and Belgium).

However, the subsequent release of "When Will I See You Again" ensured international recognition when the song became #1 in the UK charts for two weeks in August 1974 (the first time this had been achieved by an all female group since The Supremes). Following an appearance on Top of the Pops, other countries followed suit and "When Will I See You Again" did extremely well worldwide reaching #2 in the U.S. where it sold over two million copies and earned the group a gold record in 1974.

The group recorded two live albums in 1975 and a further studio album The Three Degrees International. This album was called Take Good Care of Yourself in the UK, the title song of which reached the top 10 in the same country. The album itself reached #6 in the UK Albums Chart.

In 1976, they released the album A Toast of Love (for the Far East market), the title song of which was released internationally. This was the year that Fayette Pinkney left and was replaced by former member Helen Scott. They then released Standing Up for Love, an album, in 1977.

In 1978 and 1979, they released two disco-styled albums New Dimensions and 3D. From these albums. they had four top 20 hits in the UK with "Givin' Up, Givin' In", "Woman in Love", "The Runner" (co-written by Ferguson) and "My Simple Heart". They also released A Collection of Their 20 Greatest Hits, a compilation album.

The group performed at Prince Charles' 30th birthday party, and in 1979, filmed their own TV special The Three Degrees at The Royal Albert Hall with the Royal Philharmonic Orchestra.

In 1980 they released Gold, another compilation album, which reached the top 10 in the UK Album Charts, and in 1982, they recorded a TV show for the BBC (Take Three Degrees), performing their greatest hits. They then released two albums Album of Love and Live in the UK. The single "Liar", co-written by Ferguson, was released. and in 1985, they released "The Heaven I Need" and "This Is The House", produced by Stock, Aitken and Waterman.

Ferguson left The Three Degrees in 1986 as a result of wanting to spend more time being a mother to take care of her very young daughters of the time. Sheila had mentioned in a 2006 interview that after she gave birth to her daughters, she was still singing and touring with The Three Degrees, but it caused her to limit her availability to her daughters and whenever she came home from her singing projects and tours, her daughters were noticeably clinging onto The Nanny instead of her realizing her long absences from home have caused her daughters to become emotionally distant from her, which she then made the ultimate decision to leave the group to spend more time being a mother taking care of her daughters. In addition, in the 2006 interview, which separately featured Sheila and Valerie Holiday (other Three Degrees member) in the interview, it was revealed that in 1986 Sheila called the other members of Three Degrees on a phone call to inform she was leaving the group and both Sheila and Valerie claimed on their own ends that the phone call conversation ended very abruptly and Valerie commented she was very upset feeling this conversation should have been in person and not on a phone call and commented that it was very difficult finding someone to replace Sheila in the group, which eventually they did find a new member for the group, but Valerie Holiday permanently took over Sheila's former spot as the lead singer of the group and has been in this current role since Sheila's departure. Since then, Sheila has had very limited contact with The Three Degrees and Sheila has never made any public appearances with The Three Degrees. Though in a 2011 interview with The Three Degrees on the British TV show, Lorraine, they mentioned that because they and Ferguson are from their home city of Philadelphia, they sometimes come back to their home city to visit family and friends and at times Ferguson and The Three Degrees members may encounter each other, but very often their encounters with Sheila Ferguson are only for very short brief moments and one of the members Helen Scott had mentioned their occasional encounters with Sheila Ferguson is like ships that pass in the night.    Although Sheila no longer has any professional relational encounters with The Three Degrees, she still from time to time will perform famous hit songs that she originally recorded and sang with The Three Degrees such as When Will I See You Again, Dirty Ol Man, Year Of Decision, Woman In Love, Giving Up Giving In, Take Good Care Of Yourself etc. More often she will sing When Will I See You Again whenever she performs any of the famous hit songs that she originally sang and recorded with The Three Degrees.

Solo
In 1994, Ferguson appeared as a solo artist in the UK Singles Chart with her remake of the Three Degrees' hit "When Will I See You Again". It spent one week in that listing at #60.

In 2004, Ferguson released her debut solo album A New Kind of Medicine. She is also a lead on the original cast recording of Always and recorded two other albums Misty Blue...and More and Songs from Oh! What a Night.

She featured in Star Alliance's recording of "He's a Runner" in 2006 and recorded "Fool of the Year" for the album Disco 2008, produced by Ian Levine.

Ferguson has performed in multiple soul legend tours and appeared as the Acid Queen at the 50th anniversary of The Who at the O2 Shepherd's Bush Empire in November 2014.

She starred in David Gest's (I've Had) the Time of My Life Tour! across September and October 2015, culminating in a performance at the Connaught Rooms, London, followed by performing at "The Legends of Soul Weekender" with Mary Wilson, Thelma Houston, Gwen Dickey and Jaki Graham in Skegness.

In June 2016, Ferguson performed in a series of soul gigs ("A Night of Soul") in Cyprus with Andy Abraham.

Theatre
Ferguson has starred in numerous musicals and pantomimes in the UK.

Her first musical was Always in 1997 at the Victoria Palace, London, which also starred Shani Wallis. She then starred in Soul Train (The Musical), Oh What a Night, playing Roxia, and Thoroughly Modern Millie (musical), playing Muzzy Van Hossmere.

In 2005, Ferguson starred in the premiere of the West End musical Behind the Iron Mask at the Duchess Theatre and then toured in Hot Flush, a musical based on the menopause. In 2008, she starred in Sister Act-Songs from the Film.

In 2010, Ferguson joined the cast of the Irish National Tour of Fame the Musical playing the strict head teacher Miss Sherman.

Most recently she starred in the West End musical celebration Respect La Diva at the Garrick Theatre and in Daddy Cool as Pearl.

Ferguson also appeared as the Fairy Godmother and Wicked Queen in numerous pantomimes, including Dick Whittington, Cinderella, Aladdin, and Beauty and the Beast.

From December 2012 to January 2013, Ferguson appeared in Cinderella at the Nottingham Theatre Royal as the Fairy Godmother, a role she reprised at the Theatre Royal Norwich from December 2013 to January 2014. She then starred as the Wicked Queen in Beauty and the Beast at the Theatre Royal, Windsor from December 2014 to January 2015, followed by appearing as the Fairy Godmother in Cinderella at The Sands Centre, Carlisle in December 2015.

Ferguson headlined Ipswich Regent Theatre's pantomime, playing the Wicked Fairy in Sleeping Beauty from December 2016 to January 2017. In February of 2022, she announced she would be casting in the musical, Chicago.

Television
Ferguson is the first and only black woman to star in her own sitcom in the UK. She played the lead role in the TV sitcom Land of Hope and Gloria, which ran for six episodes in 1992 and was her first acting venture. She also wrote and sang the title song for the series. Although a second series was planned, the idea was shelved after the death of co-star Joan Sanderson.

She has appeared in the British sitcom Desmond's, playing nightclub owner Rochelle Jackson, and the British soap opera Brookside, playing Susan Robinson.

Ferguson was a panelist in Les Dawson's first hosting of the quiz show Blankety Blank in 1984 and has appeared on the TV show Never Mind the Buzzcocks several times, three times as a panelist and once dressed as a pirate in the celebrity line up. She also appeared on Comic Relief in Da Bungalow.

In 2004 Ferguson was a contestant on the fourth series of I'm a Celebrity... Get Me Out of Here!, followed by being a contestant in the first series of Celebrity MasterChef  in 2006. In May 2011, she starred in the second series of Channel 4s Celebrity Five Go To, in which the celebrities visited South Africa.

She has appeared as a celebrity contestant on The Weakest Link, Who Wants to Be a Millionaire? and Pointless Celebrities (in both 2013 and 2014).

Ferguson appeared in the second BBC series of The Real Marigold Hotel, and spent a month in India with seven other celebrities.

Presenter
Ferguson presented the documentary The Philadelphia Records Story for Smooth FM in the UK on March 22, 2009.

On April 11, 2012, Ferguson co-hosted Newcastle-based charity, Toma Fund's Eurovision Reunited event..

Author
In 1989, Ferguson published a cook book inspired by recipes from her African American background, Soul Food: Classic Cuisine from the Deep South. She is the first African American in England to ever publish a cookbook related to Soul food.

Awards
In 2013 Ferguson was awarded the Variety Legends of Industry Award for services to music.

She was awarded an Ethnic Minority Business Foundation national achievement award by the Bank of England and its Governor Eddie George in 1999 and was awarded the City of Compton California Book Award for her book Soul Food: Classic Cuisine from the Deep South.

Philanthropy
Ferguson is a patron of the theatre charity The Music Hall Guild of Great Britain and America and has long been a supporter of the Combined Theatrical Charities taking part in the launch of its Acting for Others campaign in 2003. She has been a patron of the national parenting charity, Parentalk, from 1997, raising over £70K for the charity through celebrity appearances. She is also a supporter of WaterAid and appeared in the 2014 To Be a Girl campaign.

She has appeared on two charity singles, It's a Live-In World for the Anti Heroin Project in 1986, and Give Give Give produced by Paul Hardcastle under the title Disco Aid in 1986, followed by a re-production by Stock, Aitken & Waterman under the title Dance Aid in 1987 to support multiple sclerosis research.

Ferguson has been an active supporter of artists rights through her membership and work for both the Phonographic Performance Ltd and the Performing Rights Society. The board of PPL voted unanimously to make Ferguson a Lifetime Guardian Member of the organisation after merging with the Performing Artists Media Rights Organisation (of which she was a founder member on the original board) in 2006. She has been an Equity (trade union) Councillor and an events speaker at and on behalf of Equity. Ferguson has also been a judge at the Race in Media Awards on several occasions.

She has been an Ambassador for The Prince's Trust since 2008.

Personal life
After marrying property businessman Chris Robinson in 1980, Ferguson settled in Bray, Berkshire. Ferguson and Robinson had twin daughters, Alicia and Alexandria, before divorcing in 2004.  From sometime in 2005 until 2010, she had temporarily resided in Mallorca with her partner Jonathan Curry who was a theatre technician and was roughly 20 years her junior, but because of his sudden death from health complications in 2010, she has since then resettled back entirely in England and has remained mainly single since then. She has commented in some interviews that because her encounter with Prince Charles back in the 1970s, which created media attention in England, this lasting media impression made it difficult for her to find new relationships after her divorce.

Discography

The Three Degrees
 1970: Maybe
 1973: The Three Degrees
 1975: International
 1975: The Three Degrees Live in Japan
 1976: A Toast of Love
 1976: The Three Degrees Live
 1977: Standing Up for Love
 1978: New Dimensions
 1979: 3D
 1982: Album of Love
 1985: Live in the UK

Solo
 2004: A New Kind of Medicine

Theatre

Filmography

Film
 1970: The French Connection

Television
 1992: Land of Hope and Gloria
 1992: Brookside
 1992: Desmonds

References

External links
 
 

1947 births
20th-century American actresses
20th-century African-American women singers
21st-century American actresses
21st-century African-American women singers
Actresses from Philadelphia
African-American actresses
American emigrants to England
American emigrants to Spain
American film actresses
American soul singers
American stage actresses
American television actresses
American women singers
I'm a Celebrity...Get Me Out of Here! (British TV series) participants
Living people
Musicians from Philadelphia
Singers from Pennsylvania